Kunguma Kodu is a 1988 Indian Tamil-language film, directed by V. Azhagappan. The film stars Mohan, Nalini, Suresh and Ramya Krishnan .

Cast 

Mohan
Suresh
Nalini
Ramya Krishnan
Senthil

Soundtrack
The music was composed by S. A. Rajkumar.   Associate Music director was U Vidhyasagar

References

External links
 

1980 films
1988 films
1980s Tamil-language films
Films directed by V. Azhagappan